The Boston Municipal Court (BMC), officially the Boston Municipal Court Department of the Trial Court, is a department of the  Trial Court of the Commonwealth of Massachusetts, United States.  The court hears criminal, civil, mental health, restraining orders, and other types of cases. The court also has an appellate division (composed of justices that sit in rotating panels of three) which reviews questions of law that arise from civil matters filed in the eight divisions of the department.

History

Boston Police Court and Justices' Court for the County of Suffolk
The court's history dates to 1822, the year in which Boston was chartered as a city. Two courts were established, both served by the same judges: the Boston Police Court, to hear criminal matters, and the Justices' Court for the County of Suffolk, to address civil claims. The two courts remained distinct until 1860 when the Justices' Court was abolished, and its civil jurisdiction transferred to the Police Court.

Municipal Court of the City of Boston/Boston Municipal Court Department
In 1866, the Police Court was abolished, and its records and jurisdiction transferred to the newly created Municipal Court of the City of Boston. In 1978, the Massachusetts Court Reform Act established the Boston Municipal Court Department as one of the seven departments of the Trial Court of Massachusetts. In 2003, the department expanded to eight divisions, after it was given authority by the Massachusetts Legislature over seven other Boston-based courts.

Probation pioneer
The Boston Police Court has the distinction of participating in the initial development of the modern concept of probation in the United States. In 1841 John Augustus, the "Father of Probation", persuaded a judge in the Police Court to give him custody of a convicted "common drunkard" for a brief period. The offender was ordered to appear in court three weeks later for sentencing. He returned to court accompanied by Augustus a sober man, his appearance and demeanor dramatically changed. The judge was so impressed with his sober and dignified appearance that he waived the usual penalty of 30 days in jail and instead levied a fine of one cent plus court costs ($3.76).

Augustus thus began an 18-year career as a volunteer probation officer, subsequently credited with founding the investigations process, one of three main concepts of modern probation, the other two being intake and supervision. Augustus was also the first to apply the term "probation" to his method of treating offenders from the Latin verb "probare": to prove, to test.

In 1878 a law was passed by the legislature authorizing the Mayor of Boston to appoint a probation officer for Suffolk County. The continued success of the system led to its extension to district and police courts in other towns and cities in the state. In 1898 a law was passed extending the probation system by authorizing the appointment of probation officers by the Superior Court.

Jurisdiction
The jurisdiction of the court is within Suffolk County, Massachusetts, and the types of criminal cases that may be filed include most felonies and misdemeanors that do not require a state prison sentence, as well as felonies punishable by a sentence of up to 5 years. If a state prison sentence is mandated, the Court may conduct probable cause hearings to determine whether offenses will be bound over to the Superior Court. Magistrates conduct hearings to issue criminal complaints and arrest warrants, and to determine whether there is probable cause to detain persons arrested without a warrant. Both judges and magistrates issue criminal and administrative search warrants.

The types of civil cases that may be filed in the BMC include contract, tort and replevin actions in which the likely recovery does not exceed $50,000; small claims cases in which the amount in controversy does not exceed $7,000 (initially tried before a magistrate, with a defense right of appeal either to a judge or jury); summary process/eviction cases; supplementary process cases; mental health matters (including involuntary commitments and medication orders, and supervision of criminal defendants committed for mental observation or have been found incompetent to stand trial, or after an insanity acquittal); abuse prevention/restraining orders and harassment prevention orders; civil motor vehicle infraction appeals (initially tried before a magistrate, with a right of appeal to a judge and a final appeal to the appellate division); paternity and support actions; and violations of certain city ordinances and by-laws. In certain circumstances, civil actions may be filed in the BMC even if the parties do not reside or have a usual place of business in Suffolk County, or if the defendant resides or does business outside the state.

The court has jurisdiction for review of findings of the Massachusetts State Police Trial Board and equitable jurisdiction in lead poisoning prevention; landlord interference with quiet enjoyment or failure to provide utilities; sanitary code; and residential nuisances. The court also has jurisdiction to review government agency actions, such as unemployment compensation appeals, victim of violent crime compensation appeals, and firearms license appeals.

Divisions
 Brighton Division
 Central Division
 Charlestown Division
 Dorchester Division
 East Boston Division
 Roxbury Division
 South Boston Division
 West Roxbury Division

Composition
The court consists of a Chief Justice and 30 Associate Justices appointed by the Governor of Massachusetts with the consent of the
Governor's Council.  The Judges hold office until the mandatory retirement age of seventy. Chief Justice Roberto Ronquillo, Jr. was appointed in 2013.

Judges
As of 2023, the court's members are as follows:

Chief Justices
 John W. Bacon (1866–1871)
 Mellen Chamberlain (1871–1878)
 John Wilder May (1878–1883)
 William E. Parmenter (1883–1902)
 John Freeman Brown (1902–1906)
 Wilfred Bolster (1906–1939)
 F. Delano Putnam (1939–1943)
 Davis B. Keniston (1943–1954)
 Elijah Adlow (1954–1973)
 Jacob Lewiton (1973–1978)
 Harry J. Elam (1978–1983)
 Theodore A. Glynn, Jr. (1983–1986)
 Joseph F. Feeney (1986–1988)
 William J. Tierney (1988–2002)
 Charles R. Johnson (2003–2013) (Acting 2002–2003)
 Roberto Ronquillo, Jr. (2013–present)

Notable former judges

 Jennie Loitman Barron, 1937–1959; first woman to serve as a full-time judge in Massachusetts.
 Margaret Burnham, 1977–1982; First African American female judge in Massachusetts
 Richard J. Chin, 1989–1993; first Asian American judge in Massachusetts.
 Harry J. Elam, 1971–1983 (Chief Justice 1978–1983); first African American Chief Justice in Massachusetts, and the first African-American appointee to the BMC.
 Linda Giles, 1991–1998; First openly LGBT female appointed as a judge in Massachusetts
 Charles A. Grabau, 1979–1985; first Hispanic judge in Massachusetts.
 Dermot Meagher, 1989–2006; first openly gay judge in Massachusetts.
 George A. O'Toole Jr., 1982–1990; In 1995 O'Toole was nominated by President Bill Clinton to a new seat on the United States District Court for the District of Massachusetts. O'Toole presided over the 2015 trial of Dzhokhar Tsarnaev, one of the perpetrators of the Boston Marathon bombing.
 George Lewis Ruffin, 1883–1886; appointed to Municipal Court of Charlestown; first African-American judge in the United States.
 George Duncan Wells, 1859–1862; resigned his seat and entered the service during the Civil War, died in Strasburg, Virginia on October 13, 1864.
 Mario Umana, 1973-1991

Specialty sessions
Specialty Courts are problem-solving court sessions which provide court-supervised probation and mandated treatment focused on treating the mental health or substance abuse issues underlying criminal behavior. The BMC has the following specialty court sessions:
 Drug Court
 Firearm Session
 Homeless Court
 Mental Health Session
 Veterans Treatment Session

Notable cases
 Commonwealth v. Glik No. 0701CR6687 (2007)
 Justices of Boston Municipal Court v. Lydon,

See also
 Courts of Massachusetts
 List of courthouses in Boston

Images
Former homes

Notes

References

Further reading

External links
 Official website
 Boston Municipal Court Judicial Calendars

Boston Municipal Court
Boston Municipal Court
Government of Suffolk County, Massachusetts
Government of Massachusetts
1822 establishments in Massachusetts
Municipal courts
Courts and tribunals established in 1822